North Table Mountain is a mesa on the eastern flank of the Front Range of the Rocky Mountains of North America.

Mesa
The most distinctive feature of the mesa is its nearly flat cap that was formed by ancient Paleocene lava flows. It is separated from companion South Table Mountain, which consists of the same geologic formation, by Clear Creek.

North Table Mountain is a popular scenic and recreational destination in the Denver metro area, and it is preserved as public open space by Jefferson County and the Access Fund.  Recent and ongoing projects by Jefferson County Open Space have resulted in the construction of several new trails and eliminated large numbers of unofficial trails.

Geology

North Table Mountain is underlain by sedimentary rocks of the Denver Formation, which spans the interval from latest Cretaceous to early Paleocene time. An exposure of the Cretaceous-Paleogene boundary layer has been identified and documented on nearby South Table Mountain.

Three prominent, columnar jointed, cliff-forming lava flows can be seen on North Table Mountain, one exposed part way up the northwest slope, and two that form its cap. The flows are about 62 to 64 million years old according to radiometric dating, which places them in the early Paleocene epoch. Generally referred to as basaltic, they are classified either as monzonite (the lowest flow) and latite (the upper two flows), or as shoshonite. They contain the minerals augite, plagioclase, and olivine altered to serpentine, with accessory sanidine, orthoclase, apatite, magnetite, and biotite.

Zeolite
Both North and South Table Mountain are known for the wide variety of zeolite minerals  that occur in vesicles in the second flow. These include analcime, thomsonite, mesolite, chabazite, and others. Excellent specimens of the Table Mountain zeolites can be seen at the nearby Mines Museum of Earth Science.

Wildlife
Among the animals known to frequent the mesa through time, according to local newspaper accounts , are mountain sheep, coyotes, mountain lions, plenty of deer, elk, rattlesnakes, and more.  Of these, most except for the mountain sheep continue to live upon the mountain today. Several areas are closed seasonally to protect several species of nesting raptors. In the late 19th century bees also nested in the cliffs.

Fire
On July 22, 2005, more than 200 acres (81 hectares) were set ablaze. Two fifteen-year-old boys were charged with first-degree felony arson and misdemeanor fourth-degree arson for lighting fireworks. They claimed to have shot off a Roman Candle, which started several small spot fires at the base of the north face. They fled the scene, but an area resident had witnessed the act and reported them to the police after the fire escalated, and they were soon found. The fire was contained later the same day, but it was summer with dry prairie grass conditions, so the fire had spread rapidly. It only burned one structure, a toolshed, and some other small miscellaneous pieces of property, but it cost more than 100,000 dollars (U.S. currency) to contain and extinguish.

Pictures

See also

List of Colorado mountain ranges
List of Colorado mountain summits
List of Colorado fourteeners
List of Colorado 4000 meter prominent summits
List of the most prominent summits of Colorado
List of Colorado county high points

References

External links

North Table Mountain Park website
North Table Mountain Trail Group, City of Golden website
Teens Charged With Setting Table Mountain Fire TheDenverChannel.com

Mesas of Colorado
Landforms of Jefferson County, Colorado
North American 2000 m summits
Geology of Colorado
Volcanoes of Colorado
Golden, Colorado